Söllingen is a municipality in the district of Helmstedt, in Lower Saxony, Germany. The Municipality Söllingen includes the villages of Dobbeln, Söllingen and Wobeck. And since 1 November 2016, the former municipalities Ingeleben and Twieflingen are part of the municipality Söllingen.

References

Helmstedt (district)